Un Pecado Por Mes ( One sin per month) is a 1949 Argentine comedy film directed by Mario C. Lugones and written by Julio Porter. It premiered on May 18, 1949.

Plot
Paloma and Marcel simulate toward each other that they are rich as they develop a whirlwind romance. She works as a secretary at a prominent auction house. He is a full-time student whose poor parents struggle to pay his tuition. To impress her, Marcel claims to be from a family of wealthy ranchers. To impress him, Paloma claims to be the daughter of Belisario Quintana, her wealthy employer who, apart from being her boss, is also her family's landlord. As the two get closer, their deceptions begin to unravel.

Cast
  Pedro Vargas 
  Susana Canales 
  Norma Giménez
  Hugo Pimentel
  Miguel Gómez Bao
  Diego Martínez
  Ramón J. Garay
  Herminia Mas
  José Nájera
  Pola Neuman
  Ricardo de Rosas
  Hedy Crilla
  Enrique de Pedro
  Tato Bores

Release
Released theatrically in Argentina in 1949, the film was released on DVD in 2009.

Recognition

References

External links
 Un Pecado por Mes at Allrovi
 Un Pecado por Mes at the Internet Movie Database

1949 films
1940s Spanish-language films
Argentine black-and-white films
Argentine comedy films
1949 comedy films
1940s Argentine films